Lyliana Wray (born December 30, 2004 in Los Angeles, California) is an American actress who began her career with Marvista's 2015 film Girl Missing and has since gone on to appear in Paramount's 2016 film Maximum Ride, ABC's Black-ish, CBS All Access' Strange Angel, NBC's The Night Shift, Nickelodeon's 2019 revival of Are You Afraid of the Dark? and Paramount's 2022 release of Top Gun: Maverick.

Career
She appeared in Joel Soisson's Girl Missing. In 2016, Wray appeared in Paramount's release of James Patterson's Maximum Ride. That same year, Albedo Absolute, a short-film directed by Vlad Marsavin, was released. In 2017, Wray appeared in Gabe Sachs and Jeff Judah's The Night Shift. The following year, Lyliana was cast in the Black-ish season four episode "North Star," appeared as young Susan in three episodes of the television series Strange Angel and was cast in the lead role of Rachel Carpenter in Nickelodeon's revival of Are You Afraid of the Dark?. Wray appears in Joe Kosinski's Top Gun: Maverick in the role of Amelia Benjamin.

Filmography

References

External links
 

21st-century American actresses
Living people
American actresses
2004 births